In 1878, a group of local Chinese in Hong Kong presented a petition to the Governor of Hong Kong, John Pope Hennessy, to set up the Po Leung Kuk to rescue the kidnapped victims. The main objective of Po Leung Kuk is to care for the young and protect the innocent.

The Kuala Lumpur Po Leung Kuk Committee was established in 1895 under the administration of Mrs. Daly.

See also
Po Leung Kuk
Singapore Po Leung Kuk

References

External links
Hong Kong Po Leung Kuk website

1895 establishments in British Malaya
Organizations established in 1895
Po Leung Kuk
Po Leung Kuk